Angela Paola de' Rossi (1506 - 11 November 1573) was an Italian noblewoman. She was born to Troilo I de' Rossi and Bianca Riario in San Secondo Parmense. Her first husband was Vitello Vitelli and her second was Alessandro Vitelli, both from the Vitelli family. She died in Città di Castello.

People from San Secondo Parmense
1506 births
1573 deaths
Angela
16th-century Italian women